is a Japanese politician of the Democratic Party of Japan (DPJ), a member of the House of Representatives in the Diet (national legislature). He became deputy secretary-general of the DPJ on 24 September 2012.

Early life and education
Born on 17 January 1962 in Miyagi Prefecture, Azumi is a native of Oshika District in Miyagi Prefecture and graduate of Waseda University social science department.

Career
Azumi worked at the public broadcaster NHK from 1985 to 1993. He ran for the House of Representatives for the first time in 1993 as an independent (Japan New Party and New Party Harbinger endorsement) in the three-member Miyagi 2nd district, but lost as two Liberal Democrats and one Socialist carried the district for the established parties. He later joined New Party Harbinger and participated in the foundation of the DPJ in 1996. He was elected to the House of Representatives for the first time as a Democratic candidate in the 1996 election in the new single-member Miyagi 5th district.

In government
In September 2011 he was appointed as Finance Minister in the cabinet of newly appointed prime minister Yoshihiko Noda.

On 24 September 2012, Azumi declared that he will leave his post as minister to take a key role in the DPJ as top deputy secretary-general after the elections that will be at the end of 2012 or in 2013. In the 1 October 2012 cabinet reshuffle, he was succeeded as Minister of Finance by Koriki Jojima.

Personal life
Azumi is married and has two children.

References 

|-

|-

|-

|-

1962 births
Living people
Democratic Party of Japan politicians
Government ministers of Japan
Members of the House of Representatives (Japan)
Ministers of Finance of Japan
NHK
Noda cabinet
Waseda University alumni
21st-century Japanese politicians